Aldeburgh Brick Pit is a  geological Site of Special Scientific Interest in Aldeburgh in Suffolk. It is a Geological Conservation Review site, and it is in the Suffolk Coast and Heaths Area of Outstanding Natural Beauty.

This site has a sequence of deposits dating to the Pleistocene, and it is one of the few to have deposits dating to the Bramertonian Stage, around two million years ago. It has been fundamental to two studies of the early Pleistocene in the area.

The site is private land with no public access.

References

Sites of Special Scientific Interest in Suffolk
Geological Conservation Review sites
Aldeburgh